Karl Bruggmann (29 July 1935 – 8 May 2022) was a Swiss wrestler. He competed in the men's freestyle welterweight at the 1960 Summer Olympics.

References

External links
 

1935 births
2022 deaths
Swiss male sport wrestlers
Olympic wrestlers of Switzerland
Wrestlers at the 1960 Summer Olympics
Sportspeople from Lucerne